Chíquiza is a town and municipality in the Central Boyacá Province, part of the Colombian Department of Boyacá. Chíquiza was called San Pedro de Iguaque until July 17, 2003 when the name was changed to Chíquiza. Chíquiza borders Arcabuco in the north, Sora and Sáchica in the south, Villa de Leyva in the west and Motavita in the east.

Etymology 
The name Chíquiza comes from Chibcha and means "only" or "alone", "Chiqui" means priest. Another origin is given from the word chequiza; "hairy field".

History 
Before the Spanish conquest, Chíquiza was part of the loose Muisca Confederation and ruled by a cacique who was loyal to the zaque of Hunza. The village was important in the religion of the Muisca as it was close to the sacred Lake Iguaque; the birthplace of Bachué, mother goddess of the Muisca.

Modern Chíquiza was founded in 1556 and became a part of Tunja until 1982. In 2003 the name was changed from San Pedro de Iguaque to Chíquiza.

Economy 
The economy of Chíquiza is centered around agriculture and livestock farming. Main agricultural products are maize, potatoes, peas, wheat, nabo, ibia, ruba and onions.

Gallery

References 

Municipalities of Boyacá Department
Populated places established in 1556
1556 establishments in the Spanish Empire
Muisca Confederation
Muysccubun